Joseph Blackmore (born 23 February 2003) is an English international cyclist. He has represented England at the Commonwealth Games.

Biography
Blackmore finished third at the 2022 National Cyclo-Cross Championships. He joined Team Inspired from ROTOR Race Team.

In 2022, he was selected for the 2022 Commonwealth Games in Birmingham, where he competed in the men's mountain biking cross country and finished in 5th place, a result he counts as the best on his career.  

Blackmore took his first UCI Cyclocross win at Clanfield in the 2022-2023 season, beating national champion Thomas Mein in the process and finished 2nd in the National Cyclocross Championships, winning the U23 title. Despite racing lightly due to a busy Mountainbike schedule finished 8th in his only U23 World Cup race of the season in France.

Major results

Cyclo-cross

2019–2020
 National Junior Trophy Series
3rd Pembrey
2021–2022
 National Trophy Series
1st Milnthorpe
 3rd National Championships
 3rd Clanfield
2022–2023
 1st  National Under-23 Championships
 1st Clanfield
 2nd  Team relay, UCI World Championships
 National Trophy Series
2nd Paignton
2nd Broughton Hall
2nd Gravesend
 2nd National Championships
 2nd Andover

Mountain Bike

2022
 2nd Cross-country, National Under-23 Championships

Road

2023
 6th Overall Tour du Rwanda

References

2003 births
Living people
British male cyclists
Cyclists at the 2022 Commonwealth Games
Commonwealth Games competitors for England